This is an incomplete list of museums in Finland. According to a report, the total number of museums in Finland is 280 (2013), of which 139 are cultural history museums, 71 special museums, 55 art museums and 17 natural history museums. Circa 160 of these are run professionally. The central organisation for Finnish museums is the 1923 established Finnish Museums Association.

National museums 
National central museums of Finland are the Finnish Museum of Natural History, the National Museum of Finland and the Finnish National Gallery which comprises three museums; Ateneum, Kiasma, and the Sinebrychoff Art Museum.

Regional museums and regional art museums 
Finland has 22 regional museums and 16 regional art museums. They are responsible for promoting and guiding museum activities in their own area. The regional museum network was established in 1980 by the Finnish Ministry of Education and Culture. The regional network covers the whole of Finland excluding Åland.

Regional museums

Regional art museums

National specialist museums 
Seventeen National specialist museums are responsible for the storage, research and exhibition of the subjects on their own field. The first specialist museums were named in 1992.

Other selected museums

Art museums

History and specialized museums

Historic house museums

References

External links
 Finnish Museums Association

Finland
Museums
Museums
Museums
Finland